= Committee to Boycott Nixon's Memoirs =

The Committee to Boycott Nixon's Memoirs was an organization founded in 1978 to protest the release of RN, the memoirs of former United States president Richard Nixon. A group of 19 people led by carpet cleaner Tom Flanigan and restaurateur Bill Boleyn gathered money and produced T-shirts, bumper stickers, and buttons with the slogan "Don't Buy Books By Crooks". The campaign's newspaper ads were turned down by The New York Times and The Washington Post, but they did get media attention, including their shirt being seen on Saturday Night Live. During the controversy over the publication, The New York Times, who themselves had paid to publish excerpts of the memoirs, published an editorial stating that they favoured letting the "marketplace decide the issue" and that the newspaper was against "blacklists of any sort".
